Crassispira soamanitraensis is a species of sea snail, a marine gastropod mollusc in the family Pseudomelatomidae.

Description
The length of the shell attains 10 mm.

Distribution
This marine species occurs off Madagascar.

References

 Bozzetti, L., 2008. - Tre nuove specie appartenenti al genere Crassispira Swainson, 1840 (Gastropoda: Hypsogastropoda: Turridae) dal Madagascar meridionale. Malacologia Mostra Mondiale 58: 16-18

External links
 

soamanitraensis
Gastropods described in 2008